The 2020–21 St. Louis Blues season was the 54th season for the National Hockey League franchise that was established in 1967. Head coach Craig Berube coached his third season with the team.

On December 20, 2020, the league temporarily realigned into four divisions with no conferences due to the COVID-19 pandemic and the ongoing closure of the Canada–United States border. As a result of this realignment, the Blues would play this season in the West Division and would only play games against the other teams in their new division during the regular season and potentially the first two rounds of the playoffs.

On May 7, 2021, the Blues clinched a playoff berth despite a 4–3 overtime loss to the Vegas Golden Knights. The Blues were eliminated from the playoffs in a four-game sweep by the Colorado Avalanche, with a 5-2 loss in game four on May 23.

Standings

Divisional standings

Schedule and results

Regular season
The regular season schedule was published on December 23, 2020.

Playoffs

Player statistics

Skaters

Goaltenders

Roster Changes

Draft picks

Below are the St. Louis Blues selection at the 2020 NHL Draft which was held on October 6–7 at  NHL Network Studios

Notes

References

St. Louis Blues seasons
St. Louis Blues
St. Louis Blues
St. Louis Blues